David French Carpenter, born June 7, 1899, in Clay County, West Virginia died May 22, 1965, was a noted West Virginia mountaineer Old time fiddle player.  He is listed by the Library of Congress as a musician on two sound recordings: Elzics Farewell, Kanawha, 1976; and Old-time music from Clay County, West Virginia, Charleston, W.Va., Folk Promotions, 1964.

References

1899 births
1965 deaths
Old-time fiddlers
People from Clay County, West Virginia
Musicians from West Virginia
20th-century American violinists